Endopleura is a genus of flowering plants belonging to the family Humiriaceae.

Its native range is Northern Brazil.

Species:
 Endopleura uchi (Huber) Cuatrec.

References

Humiriaceae
Malpighiales genera